TANS Peru Flight 222 was a domestic passenger flight from Jorge Chávez International Airport to Chachapoyas Airport with a stopover at FAP Captain José Abelardo Quiñones González International Airport in Peru, which crashed on 9 January 2003. The flight was operated by a Fokker F28-1000 Fellowship short range airliner. The aircraft crashed into the side of a hill while on approach to Chachapoyas Airport. All 46 passengers and crew aboard were killed in the deadliest crash in airline's history.

An investigation led by Peru's air accident investigation body, the Ministry of Transport and Communications determined the primary cause of the crash was multiple crew errors including poor crew communication and over confidence.

Accident
Flight 222 departed Chiclayo at 08:17 local time and was cleared to flight level 190 on a heading of 075. At 08:32 the flight turned left to heading 060 and four minutes later began a descent to flight level 130. Fifty seconds later the crew initiated a right turn to heading 135 to line up with runway 13 at Chachapoyas Airport. Rescue teams didn't find the wreckage until two days later. None of the occupants survived as the plane was pulverized by the crash.

Aircraft
The aircraft involved was a Dutch built Fokker F28-Mk1000 twin-engine short range jet airliner manufactured in 1975. Its serial number was 11100 and it was registered OB-1396. At the time of the accident, the aircraft had accumulated 3,127 hours of flight time.  Until 1995 this F-28 was used as one of the presidential transports in VIP configuration, for short-haul and internal flights.

Investigation

The Peruvian Ministry of Transport and Communications commenced an investigation, which began shortly after the crash. Both the cockpit voice recorder (CVR) and flight data recorder (FDR) were recovered. Examination of the CVR revealed the crew was over confident and failed to follow published procedures. The landing check list was not followed and communication between the crew was poor.

Chachapoyas Airport has a VHF omnidirectional range (VOR) so the crew knew in what direction the airport was, however no distance measuring equipment (DME) was available so they could not be sure how far from the runway they were. In conditions of very poor visibility the flight began the descent too early leading to impact with a hill side approximately 10 miles north of the airport.

The official report states controlled flight into terrain due to "complacency" and "the lack of effective communication" between the crew as the most probable primary cause of the accident. A contributing factor could have been the death of the co-pilot's father four days before the accident flight, possibly distracting him. The investigators also found the crew's work environment to be unsatisfactory due to constant management changes and lack of wages and bonuses paid.

See also

TANS Perú Flight 204

References

External links
Final report 
A photo of the crash site

Airliner accidents and incidents involving controlled flight into terrain
Aviation accidents and incidents in Peru
Aviation accidents and incidents in 2003
Accidents and incidents involving the Fokker F28
January 2003 events in South America
222